Prinsessen som ingen kunne målbinde (The Princess Who Always Had to Have the Last Word) is a Norwegian short film from 1932 based on the fairytale of the same name by Peter Christen Asbjørnsen. Harald Stormoen starred as the king, Andreas Aabel as Askeladd, and Unni Torkildsen as the princess. The film was directed by Walter Fürst.

Plot
At the royal court, the beautiful and loud-mouthed princess is amused by all her stupid suitors, who are thrown out one by one because they cannot marry her. Outside the old stave church, the king's soldiers read out the regulation on branding. Poor Askeladd and his two smug older brothers decide to set off to try their luck. To everyone's astonishment, Askeladd manages to best the princess, and the two brothers fail. Askeladd is rewarded with the princess and half the kingdom, and the brothers are branded.

Cast

 Andreas Aabel as Askeladd
 Harald Stormoen as the king
 Unni Torkildsen as the princess
 Egil Hjorth-Jenssen as Pål
 Eugen Skjønberg as Per
 Finn Bernhoft as the ensign
 Johannes Jensen as the master
 Marie Hedemark as the brothers' mother
 Birger Løvaas as the suitor

References

External links
 
 Prinsessen som ingen kunne målbinde at the National Library of Norway
 Prinsessen som ingen kunne målbinde at Filmfront

1932 films
Norwegian black-and-white films
Norwegian adventure films
1930s Norwegian-language films